Brunswick Golden Isles Airport , previously known as Glynco Jetport, is a county-owned public-use airport located five nautical miles (9 km) north of the central business district of Brunswick, a city in Glynn County, Georgia, United States. It is mostly used for general aviation, but is also served by one commercial airline.

History
Before 1975 the airport was Naval Air Station Glynco . Named NAS Glynco as an abbreviation of Glynn County, it was a base for lighter-than-air airships, known as blimps.  

In 1973 Delta Air Lines McDonnell Douglas DC-9-30s flew direct from Glynco to Atlanta and Orlando and nonstop to Augusta, Jacksonville and Macon (the Augusta and Macon flights continued to Atlanta). In the Delta March 1, 1973 timetable, a DC-9-30 was scheduled Chicago O'Hare Airport - Cincinnati - Atlanta - Savannah - Brunswick - Jacksonville - Orlando. By fall 1974 Delta was no longer flying jets from the airport. Atlantic Southeast Airlines (ASA) began serving the airport in 1981 with nonstop flights to Atlanta. In 1984 ASA began code sharing with Delta, operating as the Delta Connection and marking a return of Delta service to Brunswick. ASA flew Embraer EMB-110 Bandeirantes, Short 360s, and Embraer EMB 120 Brasilias nonstop from Atlanta. In 2002 the carrier introduced regional jet service to the airport with the Bombardier CRJ100/200. ASA's service was later replaced by Endeavor Air which continues to provide service as Delta Connection into 2022 using CRJ-200 regional jets. 
Earlier, Delta served Brunswick via the McKinnon St. Simons Island Airport from the mid 1940s through the 1960s using Douglas DC-3 and Convair 440 prop aircraft.

As TRAWING 8 was decommissioned and VT-86 transferred to Training Air Wing SIX at NAS Pensacola, Florida, the Glynn County community hastily took control of its destiny when a group of 19 community leaders formed the Glynco Steering Committee to attract new users to the facility. Their hard work paid off in 1975 when the Federal Law Enforcement Training Center (FLETC) selected the former Glynco site for a consolidated training academy for federal law enforcement personnel. FLETC constructed their facility on the former blimp facility, while the community retained the airfield proper and its runway, which was designated the official county municipal airport in 1975. Both developments proved to be invaluable to the future of Brunswick and the Golden Isles. Contributions to the local economy and population of Glynn County by the FLETC have exceeded even the Navy's considerable impact, and the  jet runway has been an important community asset.

The Glynn County Airport Commission was established in 1980 to manage and develop new opportunities for both the Brunswick and St. Simons Island airports. Since that time, the Airport Commission has continued to improve service and facilities through a series of important upgrades and repairs. To more accurately reflect the destination for travelers and pilots, the Glynco Jetport was renamed Brunswick Golden Isles Airport in 2003. The elegant new passenger terminal, completed in 2005, reflects the local tradition of hospitality and welcome for passengers of scheduled carrier service. 

The airport has been host to many air shows in the past. The most recent was Wings over the Golden Isles on 24-26 March 2017.

Facilities and aircraft
It has one runway designated 7/25 with an  asphalt and concrete surface.

For the 12-month period ending July 31, 2007, the airport had 28,160 aircraft operations, an average of 77 per day: 74% general aviation, 11% air taxi, 9% scheduled commercial and 7% military. At that time there were 63 aircraft based at this airport: 87% single-engine, 11% multi-engine and 2% helicopter.

Airline and destination

Delta Connection service is currently operated by Endeavor Air with Bombardier CRJ-200 regional jet aircraft.

Destination statistics

Incidents and accidents
On Friday, April 5, 1991, Atlantic Southeast Airlines Flight 2311 crashed while on approach to runway 7; all 20 passengers and 3 crew perished.

See also
 Glynco, Georgia

References

External links
 Glynn County Airport Commission
 
 

Buildings and structures in Glynn County, Georgia
Airports in Georgia (U.S. state)
Airports established in 1975
Brunswick, Georgia
Transportation in Glynn County, Georgia
1975 establishments in Georgia (U.S. state)